Melongena corona, common name the Florida crown conch, is a species of sea snail, a marine gastropod mollusk in the family Melongenidae, the crown conches and their allies.

Subspecies
 Melongena corona corona (Gmelin, 1791)
 Melongena corona winnerae Petuch, 2003

Description
The shell of this species is extremely variable in terms of the degree of spiny ornamentation. Some shells are much smoother than others. These snails can be as large as about 5 in (12 cm) long, and are mostly dark brown with irregular bands of white or cream. There are small spines on the largest whorl of the smoother forms,; the most spiny forms have several rows of spines. The aperture of the shell can be closed at will with an operculum. This snail is a predator; it eats other mollusks, including scallops.

References

 Tucker, J.K. (1994). The crown conch (Melongena: Melongenidae) in Florida and Alabama with the description of Melongena sprucecreekensis, n. sp. Bulletin of the Florida Museum of Natural History, Biological Sciences. 36: 181–203
 Jensen, R. H.; Pearce, T. A. (2009). Marine Mollusks of Bermuda: Checklist and Bibliography. Delaware Museum of Natural History, Wilmington, Delaware, 473 pp.

External links
 Gmelin J.F. (1791). Vermes. In: Gmelin J.F. (Ed.) Caroli a Linnaei Systema Naturae per Regna Tria Naturae, Ed. 13. Tome 1(6). G.E. Beer, Lipsiae
 Sowerby, G. B., III. (1879). Descriptions of ten new species of shells. Proceedings of the Zoological Society of London. 1878: 795–798, pl. 48
 Clench, W. J.; Turner, R. D. (1956). The family Melongenidae in the western Atlantic. Johnsonia. 3(35): 161–188, pls 94–109
 Pilsbry, H. A. & Vanatta, E. G. (1934). Melongena corona and its races. The Nautilus. 47(4): 117-121, pl. 12
 osenberg, G.; Moretzsohn, F.; García, E. F. (2009). Gastropoda (Mollusca) of the Gulf of Mexico, Pp. 579–699 in: Felder, D.L. and D.K. Camp (eds.), Gulf of Mexico–Origins, Waters, and Biota. Texas A&M Press, College Station, Texas
  Hayes, K. A.; Karl, S. A. (2009). Phylogenetic relationships of crown conchs (Melongena spp.): the corona complex simplified. Journal of Biogeography. 36(1): 28-38.

Melongenidae
Gastropods described in 1791
Taxa named by Johann Friedrich Gmelin